The Freinberg Transmitter is a broadcasting transmitter on the Freinberg near Linz. It was established in 1928 as medium wave broadcasting station and used until 1936 a T-antenna, which hung up on two guyed masts, which were 45 metres tall.

In 1936, the T-antenna was replaced by a 165 metre tall mast, insulated against ground.

In summer 1950, the antenna mast was shortened to 120 metres, because it was too long for the new frequency and would have a bad radiation diagram.

In October 1957, the mast was again extended to 146 metres and in 1965 the transmitters were replaced by a new device.

At the beginning of the 1980s, medium wave broadcasting ceased at Freinberg. The mast is now used for FM transmission.

See also 
List of masts

References

External links 

members.aon.at
skyscraperpage.com

Radio masts and towers in Europe